Pete Marino (born April 23, 1973) is an American soccer forward currently playing for the Treasure Coast Galleons in the FESL.  Marino spent six seasons in Major League Soccer and one USL Premier Development League.

Marina attended Brevard Community College before moving to Germany to pursue a professional career.  He spent two and a half years playing in the lower division with a team identified as SC Brouck.  He then moved to Bayer Leverkusen, playing for its Regionalliga team.   Marino was picked by the Columbus Crew in the 12th round of the 1996 Inaugural Draft, overall, and emerged as the 13th-highest scorer in the first season of MLS.  In 1997, Marino led the Crew in scoring, but saw himself reduced to a substitute after being traded to the Kansas City Wizards for Frank Klopas) in 1998.  His luck was no better the next year at the Tampa Bay Mutiny, as he again scored only one goal and was waived shortly thereafter.  On May 27, 2000, D.C. United picked up Marino, who surged back to score 5 goals that season, finding play as a "super-sub".  Marino ended up at the Miami Fusion for the 2001 season, scoring a goal and an assist before suffering a knee injury which forced him to sit out for the next two years, which ultimately ended his career with the Fusion and MLS after the team was contracted at the season's end.

Though his nickname came to refer to his clever, goal-poaching style of play, and was reinforced by a notable handball goal in early MLS history, Marino was first dubbed "Sneaky" by a Crew teammate who found him slippery and hard to mark in practice games.

In 2007, Marino became a founder of, and player with, the Treasure Coast Galleons of the newly formed Florida Elite Soccer League (FESL). In 2007, Marino was named the league MVP as the Galleons won the league title.  In 2008, he finished fifth in league scoring and first in assists with 8 assists in 11 games.

Notes

External links

 

1973 births
Living people
People from Pompano Beach, Florida
American expatriate soccer players in Germany
American soccer players
Cocoa Expos players
Columbus Crew players
D.C. United players
Eastern Florida State College people
Florida Elite Soccer League players
Association football forwards
Sporting Kansas City players
Major League Soccer players
Miami Fusion players
Richmond Kickers players
Tampa Bay Mutiny players
Treasure Coast Galleons players
Soccer players from Florida
USL League Two players
A-League (1995–2004) players
MLS Pro-40 players
Bayer 04 Leverkusen players
College men's soccer players in the United States
Sportspeople from Broward County, Florida